Freakshow most commonly refers to freak show, an exhibition of rarities.

Freakshow or Freak show may also refer to:

Arts, entertainment, and media

Fictional characters
 Freakshow (comics), a Marvel Comics character
 Freakshow (Danny Phantom), a character from the TV show Danny Phantom
 Freakshow, a character played by Christopher Meloni from the film Harold & Kumar Go to White Castle

Films
 Freak Show (film), a 2017 American LGBT drama film
 Freakshow (1989 film), a Canadian horror film starring Dan Gallagher
 Freakshow (film), a 2007 horror film

Music

Albums and soundtracks
 Freak Show (album), a 1997 album by Silverchair
 Freek Show, a 2000 album by horrorcore rap group Twiztid
 Freakshow (BulletBoys album), a 1991 album by BulletBoys
 Freakshow (The Killer Barbies album), a 2004 DVD/CD set released by The Killer Barbies
 Freak Show/Freak Show Soundtrack, a 1991 album and interactive CD by The Residents

Songs
 "Freakshow" (The Cure song), a 2008 single by The Cure
 "Freakshow", song by Britney Spears from the album Blackout
 "Freak Show", song by Ingrid Michaelson from the album Stranger Songs
 "Freak Show", song by Zebrahead from the album Walk the Plank

Television 
 Freak Show (TV series), a cartoon series
 Freakshow (TV series), a reality series
 American Horror Story: Freak Show, fourth season of American Horror Story
 "Freakshow" (Legends of Tomorrow), an episode of Legends of Tomorrow
 "Freak Show" (Space Ghost Coast to Coast), an episode of Space Ghost Coast to Coast

Other uses in arts, entertainment, and media
 Freak Show, a 2007 novel about a teenage drag queen by James St. James
 Freakshow (audio drama), a Doctor Who audio drama

Other uses
 Freak Show, a nickname for the 1997 Pittsburgh Pirates season

See also
 Creepshow (disambiguation)